Bolster is a ghost town in Okanogan County, Washington, USA. In 1899, the town was platted by J.S. McBride, who named it for the Spokane financier Herman Bolster. He sold lots in the new town and at one time there were several stores, a post office and three saloons. The small town of some thirty families traded with Chesaw, each calling the other a 'suburb'. The town's newspaper, The Bolster Drill, could not make any money, and eventually went out of business. In 1909, the post office closed.  There was a school there in 1910, but it only operated that year.

Notes and references

Ghost towns in Washington (state)
Geography of Okanogan County, Washington
Populated places established in 1899